Sviny may refer to:

 Sviny (Tábor District), a village in the Czech Republic
 Sviny (Žďár nad Sázavou District), a village in the Czech Republic